Moisture equivalent is proposed by Lyman Briggs and McLane (1910) as a measure of field capacity for fine-textured soil materials. 
Moisture equivalent is defined as the percentage of water which a soil can retain in opposition to a centrifugal force 1000 times that of gravity. It is measured by saturating sample of soil 1 cm thick, and subjecting it to a centrifugal force of 1000 times gravity for 30 min. The gravimetric water content after this treatment is its moisture equivalent.
This concept is no longer used in soil physics, replaced by field capacity.

Lyman Briggs and Homer LeRoy Shantz (1912) found that:

Moisture Equivalent = 0.02 sand + 0.22 silt + 1.05 clay

Note: volume of water stored in root zone is equal to the depth of water in root zone (Vw=Dw)

See also
 Available water capacity
 Field capacity
 Nonlimiting water range
 Pedotransfer function
 Permanent wilting point

References
 
 
 

Soil physics
Equivalent units